The Faculty of Medicine is one of nine faculties at the RWTH Aachen University. It was founded in 1966. The Klinikum Aachen contains many specialised clinics, theoretical and clinical institutes and other research facilities, lecture halls, schools for jobs in the medical field, and all facilities necessary for a hospital like a laundry and central sterilisation. Approximately 2,700 students are enrolled in the faculty.

Degrees awarded

The following Degrees are awarded medicine and biomedical engineering:

 State Examination (in Medicine)
 Master of Science
 Doctor

External links
 Faculty of Medicine (English version)
 University Hospital (English version)

RWTH Aachen University